Pseudomonas abietaniphila is a Gram-negative soil bacterium that grows on pulp mill effluents with resin acids. It is able to thrive in such environments by using tricyclic diterpenoids as a carbon source. It was first isolated in Canada.

References

External links
Type strain of Pseudomonas abietaniphila at BacDive -  the Bacterial Diversity Metadatabase

Pseudomonadales
Bacteria described in 1999